VOA1 is a music radio service owned by American international broadcaster Voice of America, located in Washington, D.C. It is available as a 24-hour online webcast and a syndicated program on selected stations worldwide. It’s also available on the main feed of VOA radio.

VOA1 airs Top 40-formatted music, with 5-minute newscasts at the top of the hour, and airs special programming such as Jazz America.

History
In 1985, VOA Europe was created as a special service in English that was relayed via satellite to AM, FM, and cable affiliates throughout Europe. With a contemporary format including live disc jockeys, the network presented top musical hits as well as VOA news and features of local interest (such as "EuroFax") 24 hours a day. VOA Europe was closed down without advance public notice in January 1997 as a cost-cutting measure. It was followed by VOA Express, which from July 4, 1999, revamped into VOA Music Mix. On November 1, 2014, VOA Music Mix was rebranded to VOA1.

Programs
 Border Crossings
 Today’s Hit Countdown
 Country Hits VOA
 Jazz America
 Soul Lounge

References

External links

Voice of America
Radio in the United States